Società Polisportiva Aurora, also known simply as S.P. Aurora, was a sammarinese association football club based in Santa Mustiola, in the castle of the City of San Marino.

History

Foundation 

The club was founded in 1968.

1985–86 Campionato Sammarinese di Calcio 

S.P. Aurora participates on the first ever season of the Campionato Sammarinese di Calcio.

Dissolution 

At the end of the 1986–87 season of the Serie A2, the club entered in recess on 3 April 1987 and later was dissolved on 31 August of the same year.

Records and data 

 Seasons in Campionato Sammarinese di Calcio: 1 (1985–86).
 Seasons in Serie A2: 1 (1986–87).

References

Bibliography 

 Marco Zunino, Il calcio sammarinese: la storia, i personaggi, le squadre, 1993.

Football clubs in San Marino
Association football clubs established in 1968
Association football clubs disestablished in 1987
1968 establishments in San Marino
1987 disestablishments in San Marino